is a former basketball player for Hitachi SunRockers and Toyota Alvark in Japan.

References

1977 births
Living people
Alvark Tokyo players
Japanese men's basketball players
Sportspeople from Akita Prefecture
Sun Rockers Shibuya players
Basketball players at the 2002 Asian Games
Asian Games competitors for Japan